The Dublin City Marshal was an officer of Dublin Corporation in Ireland.

History
The origins of the office were analogous to those of the Knight Marshal in relation to the City of London. Until 1786 the Dublin Marshal was Keeper of Dublin City Marshalsea, as the Knight Marshal was for the London Marshalsea. Prior to the Municipal Corporations (Ireland) Act 1840 the Marshal was elected annually by the common council from among the freemen; typically this was a formality with the incumbent returned unopposed. The office was often a sinecure given to a relative of a senior member of the common council. The Marshal in 1838 considered his appointment effective "for life". In 1876 Alexander Martin Sullivan called the Marshal "a perfectly needless office that might well be abolished". In the 1880s the council discussed and printed reports on whether to make the office a full-time position; subsequently vacancies were publicly advertised, with election from among the applicants still done by the councillors.

After the 1920 local elections there was a Sinn Féin majority on the council, which supported the self-proclaimed Irish Republic's independence war against the UK. In 1921, when the town clerk suggested that the office of Swordbearer might be abolished, the Marshal wrote to the clerk defending the existing pawnbroking regulations, and the council agreed not to change them. The 1926 report of the Greater Dublin Commission of Inquiry proposed to remove the ceremonial vestiges of the corporation, including the Marshal. The report was not implemented, and the office of Marshal survived until 1965.

Functions
The Marshal had a ceremonial role, including leading the annual Lord Mayor's parade. In 1867, Michael Angelo Hayes "wore a scarlet tunic richly braided, and a cocked hat, a la Francaise, rode a decent-looking horse, and was admired by the crowd". In April 1900, John Howard Parnell as Marshal held the cushion holding the key of the city presented to Queen Victoria by the Lord Mayor at her ceremonial entry into the city.

The Marshal was an officer of the Lord Mayor and Sheriffs' Court, held at the Tholsel and latterly in Green Street Courthouse; in that role he took charge of the custody and sale of goods under attachment.

Register of pawnbrokers
Two 1780s statutes sanctioned a previous informal arrangement between Dublin pawnbrokers and the Marshal: the Pawnbrokers Act 1786 made the Marshal registrar of pawnbrokers' licences for the whole of Ireland; by the Pawnbrokers Act 1788, he was one of four people who could auction forfeited pledges. The others were the city Swordbearer and two nominees of the Lord Lieutenant of Ireland. The city wards were divided among the four (coterminous with the four police districts of the Borough Police) with the Marshal and Swordbearer holding the more profitable divisions. The 1838 select committee examining pawnbroking in Ireland said "the manner in which successive Marshals of the City of Dublin have discharged the duties imposed upon them by the Act, will be found by the evidence, and by the Report of the Commissioners of Municipal Inquiry, to have been exceedingly unsatisfactory".

The pawnbroking divisions had been disregarded for some decades until 1941, when the new marshal lost a lawsuit against a pawnbroker on the basis that he did not have jurisdiction as her premises was in the district of the Swordbearer, an office which had fallen into disuse. The Oireachtas passed an act in 1943 to abolish the divisions and allow the marshal to operate everywhere. The registration of pawnbrokers was passed from the Marshal to the district court from 1 January 1965. The office was then obsolete, although the final incumbent, James Cockburn, was still described as "City Marshal" in Thom's Directory in 1972.

Remuneration
An incoming Marshal had to pay surety (£2000 in 1836). The main expense prior to 1786 was the upkeep of the Marshalsea, though the Corporation sometimes granted sums to the Marshal for repairs. After 1786, the right to the fees collected in his various duties made the office of Marshal profitable; the holder often farmed out the work to subcontractors, allowing him to enjoy a sinecure. In 1833 his net income was £630. Pawnbroking had increased greatly from the 1780s to the 1830s. The reformed corporation elected in 1841 under the 1840 act was "determined ... that no officer should be considered as a sinecure", dismissed the incumbent Marshal, and hired a substitute on a fixed salary. In 1849 Thomas Reynolds received £250 and complained that he had lost money by taking the post. By 1876, the Marshal was paying the fees to the Corporation and receiving a salary of £300 from it. However, the Court of Queen's Bench ruled that the fees as registrar of pawnbrokers were not due to the Corporation, so the Marshal could keep them himself. Alexander Martin Sullivan condemned this. In 1894 the total income was about £1000 and Fenian supporters tried to get Jeremiah O'Donovan Rossa nominated to the position.

List

References

Citations

Sources
 
 
 
 
 
 
 
 
 

Marshal
Local government officers
History of local government in Ireland
City Marshal
Pawn shops
1965 disestablishments in Ireland